Ronald Erwin McNair (October 21, 1950 – January 28, 1986) was an American NASA astronaut and physicist. He died during the launch of the Space Shuttle Challenger on mission STS-51-L, in which he was serving as one of three mission specialists in a crew of seven.

Prior to the Challenger disaster, he flew as a mission specialist on STS-41-B aboard Challenger from February 3 to 11, 1984, becoming the second African American and the first Baháʼí to fly in space.

Background 
McNair was born October 21, 1950, in Lake City, South Carolina, to Pearl M. and Carl C. McNair. He had two brothers, Carl and Eric A. McNair.
In the summer of 1959, he refused to leave the segregated Lake City Public Library without being allowed to check out his books. After the police and his mother were called, he was allowed to borrow books from the library; the building that housed the library at the time is now named after him. A children's book, Ron's Big Mission, offers a fictionalized account of this event. His brother Carl  wrote Ronald's official biography, In the Spirit of Ronald E. McNair—Astronaut: An American Hero.

McNair graduated as valedictorian of Carver High School in 1967.

In 1971, he received a Bachelor of Science degree in engineering physics, magna cum laude, from the North Carolina Agricultural and Technical State University in Greensboro, North Carolina. At North Carolina A&T, he studied under professor Donald Edwards, who had established the physics curriculum at the university.

In 1976, he received a PhD degree in Physics from the Massachusetts Institute of Technology under the guidance of Michael Feld, becoming nationally recognised for his work in the field of laser physics. Also in 1976, he won the AAU Karate gold medal. He would subsequently win five regional championships and earn a 5th degree black belt in karate.

McNair received four honorary doctorates, as well as a score of fellowships and commendations. He became a staff physicist at the Hughes Research Lab in Malibu, California.

McNair was a member of the Omega Psi Phi Fraternity and a member of the Bahá'í Faith.

Astronaut career

In 1978, McNair was selected as one of thirty-five applicants from a pool of ten thousand for the NASA astronaut program. He was one of several astronauts recruited by Nichelle Nichols as part of a NASA effort to increase the number of minority and female astronauts. He flew as a mission specialist on STS-41-B aboard Challenger from February 3 to 11, 1984, becoming the second African American to fly in space.

Challenger disaster

Following the STS-41-B mission, McNair was selected for STS-51-L as one of three mission specialists in a crew of seven. The mission launched on January 28, 1986. He was killed when Challenger disintegrated nine miles above the Atlantic Ocean, 73 seconds after liftoff. The disintegration also killed six other crew members.

He was initially buried at Rest Lawn Memorial Park in Lake City, South Carolina. His remains were disinterred in 2004 and moved to Ronald E. McNair Memorial Park, located elsewhere in Lake City.

Music in space

McNair was an accomplished saxophonist.

Before his last fateful space mission, he worked with French composer and performer Jean-Michel Jarre on a piece of music for Jarre's then-upcoming album  Rendez-Vous. It was intended that he would record his saxophone solo onboard the Challenger, which would have made McNair's solo the first original piece of music to have been recorded in space (although the song "Jingle Bells" had been played on a harmonica during an earlier Gemini 6 spaceflight). However, the recording was never made, as the flight ended in the disaster and the deaths of its entire crew. The final track on Rendez-Vous, "Last Rendez-Vous," has the subtitle "Ron's Piece," and the liner notes include a dedication from Jarre: "Ron was so excited about the piece that he rehearsed it continuously until the last moment. May the memory of my friend the astronaut and the artist Ron McNair live on through this piece." McNair was supposed to have taken part in Jarre's Rendez-vous Houston concert through a live feed from the orbiting Shuttlecraft.

Public honors
McNair was posthumously awarded the Congressional Space Medal of Honor in 2004, along with all crew members lost in the Challenger and Columbia disasters.

A variety of public places, people and programs have been renamed in honor of McNair.
 The crater McNair on the Moon is named in his honor.
 The McNair Building (a.k.a. Building 37) at MIT, his alma mater, houses the Kavli Institute for Astrophysics and Space Research.
 The McNair Science Center at Francis Marion University in Florence, South Carolina
 The McNair Center for Aerospace Innovation and Research at the University of South Carolina is named in his honor.
 Ronald McNair Boulevard in Lake City, South Carolina, is named in his honor and lies near other streets named for astronauts who perished in the Challenger crash.
 The Quailbrook East development in Somerset, New Jersey has streets named after the Challenger and each of the seven astronauts.
 The U.S. Department of Education offers the TRIO Ronald E. McNair Post-Baccalaureate Achievement Program for students with low income, first generation students, and/or underrepresented students in graduate education for doctorate education.
 On January 29, 2011, the Lake City, South Carolina, library was dedicated as the Ronald McNair Life History Center. When Ronald McNair was eight, the police and his mother were called because he wished to check out books from this library, which served only white patrons before he arrived. He said, "I'll wait," to the lady and sat on the counter until the police and his mother arrived, and the officer said, "Why don't you just give him the books?" which the lady behind the counter reluctantly did. He said, "Thank you, ma'am," as he got the books. The episode as recalled by his brother Carl McNair has been depicted in a short animated film.
 Several K–12 schools have also been named after McNair.
McNair Memorial Park in El Lago, Texas, is named in his honor.
Ronald E. McNair Middle School in Lake City, South Carolina, was renamed from Carver High School in his honor (he was a high school graduate of the facility).
 Dr. Ronald E. McNair Academic High School in Jersey City, New Jersey
Ronald McNair Elementary School in Greensboro, North Carolina
Ronald McNair Elementary School in Germantown, Maryland
Ronald E. McNair Prince Hall Masonic Lodge No. 146 is named in his honor in Suitland, Maryland
 Dr. Ronald E. McNair High School in DeKalb County, Georgia, near Decatur
 Ronald E. McNair Middle School, San Antonio, Texas – Southwest ISD
 Ronald McNair Middle School in DeKalb County, Georgia, near Decatur
 Ronald McNair Middle School in College Park, Georgia
 The McNair Open Access Computer Lab at California State University, Bakersfield
 Ronald E. McNair Administrative Center in University City, Missouri
 Ronald E. McNair Elementary School in Hazelwood, Missouri
 Ronald Ervin McNair Elementary School in Denton, Texas (Denton ISD)
 Ronald McNair Middle School in Rockledge, Florida
 Ronald E. McNair Elementary School in Dallas, Texas (Dallas ISD)
 Dr. Ronald McNair Junior High School in Pearland, Texas (Alvin Independent School District), is named in honor Dr. McNair.
 Ronald E. McNair Academic Center in Chicago, Illinois
 Ronald E. McNair Junior High School in Huntsville, Alabama
 Los Robles Ronald McNair Academy in East Palo Alto, California
 Ronald E. McNair High School in Stockton, California
 PS 5, Dr. Ronald McNair School in Brooklyn, New York City, New York
 PS/MS 147 Ronald McNair in Cambria Heights Queens, New York City, New York
 McNair Elementary School in Compton, California
 Ronald E. McNair Building: Lycée Français de la Nouvelle-Orléans, New Orleans, Louisiana
 Ronald E. McNair Building: KIPP Believe College Prep, New Orleans, Louisiana
 A building on the Willowridge High School campus in Houston, Texas, is named in honor of McNair.
 There is a memorial in the Ronald McNair Park in Brooklyn, New York, in his honor.
 The Dr. Ronald E. McNair Playground in East Harlem, Manhattan, New York City, New York, is named after him.
 The Ronald E. McNair Space Theater inside the Davis Planetarium in downtown Jackson, Mississippi, is named in his honor.
 The Naval ROTC building on the campus of Southern University and A&M College in Baton Rouge, Louisiana, is named in his honor.
 The Engineering building at North Carolina A&T State University in Greensboro, North Carolina, is named in his honor. The university holds a McNair Day celebration annually.
 McNair was portrayed by Joe Morton in the 1990 TV movie Challenger.
 The song "A Drop Of Water", recorded by Japanese jazz artist Keiko Matsui, with vocals by the late Carl Anderson, was written in tribute to McNair.
 The Jean Michel Jarre track "Last Rendez-Vous" was re-titled "Ron's Piece" in his honor. McNair was originally due to record the track in space aboard Challenger, and then perform it via a live link up in Jarre's Rendez-vous Houston concert.
 The federally-funded McNair Scholars/Achievement Programs award research money and internships to juniors and seniors who are first-generation and low-income, or members of  groups that are underrepresented, in preparation for graduate study. 187 institutions participate (as of 2020). Michigan State University, Washington State University, and Syracuse University are three examples of these programs and both offer Summer Research Opportunity Program as additional program components.

Personal life 
McNair was married to Cheryl McNair, and the couple had two children. Cheryl is a Founding Director of the Challenger Center, which focuses on space science education.

See also

 List of African-American astronauts
 Space Shuttle Challenger disaster
 Rendez-vous Houston

References

External links

 McNair Foundation to encourage and mentor science, mathematics and technology students
 Spacefacts biography of Ronald McNair
 Ronald E. McNair Post – Baccalaureate Achievement Program
 
 Ronald E. McNair Postbaccalaureate Achievement Program
 StoryCorps: Astronaut's Brother Recalls A Man Who Dreamed Big

1950 births
1986 deaths
20th-century African-American people
20th-century American physicists
20th-century Bahá'ís
Accidental deaths in Florida
African-American Bahá'ís
African-American physicists
African-American scientists
MIT Department of Physics alumni
NASA civilian astronauts
North Carolina A&T State University alumni
People from Lake City, South Carolina
Recipients of the Congressional Space Medal of Honor
Space Shuttle Challenger disaster
Space Shuttle Challenger disaster victims
Space Shuttle program astronauts
Laser researchers